Port Isabel High School (PIHS) is a 4A public high school located in Port Isabel, Texas (USA). It is the sole high school in the Point Isabel Independent School District. In 2015, the school was rated "met standard" by the Texas Education Agency. As of 2019, the school is no longer a part of the Blended Learning system following the arrival of new superintendent Theresa Alarcon and principal Imelda Munivez.

Athletics
The Port Isabel Tarpons compete in:

Baseball
Basketball
Cross country running
Football
Golf
Powerlifting
Soccer
Softball
Tennis
Track and field
Volleyball

References

External links 
Official Website

High schools in Cameron County, Texas
Public high schools in Texas